

Legend

List

References

2016-17